Van Dorn may refer to:
 Van Dorn Street, a Washington metro station
 Van Dorn battle flag, a historical Confederate flag
 Van Dorn Detective Agency, fictional agency by Clive Cussler

People with the surname
 Earl Van Dorn (1820–1863), Confederate officer

See also
 CSS General Earl Van Dorn, a Confederate naval vessel